Wasteberry Camp is an Iron Age hill fort situated close to the hamlet of Blackpool, southeast of Plympton, Devon, England.

References

Hill forts in Devon